The Walloon Workers' Party (PWT) was a political party in Belgium.

History
The PWT was established by François Perin on 26 February 1965. In the May 1965 general elections the party received 0.5% of the vote and won a single seat in the Chamber of Representatives. On 25 June 1965 it merged with the Walloon Front, the Walloon Democratic Rally and the Wallon Democratic Front to form the Walloon Party, the forerunner to the Walloon Rally.

References

Political parties established in 1965
Political parties disestablished in 1965
Defunct political parties in Belgium
1965 establishments in Belgium
1965 disestablishments in Belgium